Amy-Lea Mills or Amy Mills (born 31 August 1986) is an Australian Deaflympic track and field athlete who represented Australia in 2005 Summer Deaflympics, 2009 Summer Deaflympics and in 2013 Summer Deaflympics.

Childhood 
Amy Mills was born in Dubbo, New South Wales, Australia. She was born profoundly deaf in both ears but which was not diagnosed until 18 months of age.

Career 
Amy was encouraged and motivated to participate at the 2005 Summer Deaflympics, which was held in Australia in her home country by her teacher when she was just 18 years old. But in 2004, she met in a terrible  car accident which was a major setback with a bad knee laceration and a broken thumb.

Despite the terrible accident, Amy competed at the 2005 Summer Deaflympics and went onto win a gold medal for javelin throw.

She repeated her gold medal hunt in the  2013 Summer Deaflympics for the javelin throw. Amy-Lea Mills also went onto set the new Deaflympic record for women's javelin throw with a distance of 45.98m in the 2013 Summer Deaflympics.

References 

1986 births
Living people
Deaf competitors in athletics
People from Dubbo
Australian female discus throwers
Australian female javelin throwers
Australian female shot putters
Australian deaf people
Sportswomen from New South Wales
21st-century Australian women